1-Nonyl-4-phenol is an organic compound consisting of a n-nonyl group attached to the 4-position of phenol.  The related nonylphenols with branched nonyl groups are commercially important detergents.

Alkylphenols